Aleksandr Yevgenyevich Shchyogolev (born 1 April 1972) is a Russian professional football coach and a former player who works as an assistant manager with FC Fakel Voronezh.

Club career
He made his debut in the Soviet First League in 1990 for FC Fakel Voronezh. He played 1 game for FC Spartak Moscow in the UEFA Champions League 2000–01.

Honours
 Russian Premier League champion: 2000.
 Russian Premier League runner-up: 1998.
 Russian Second Division Zone Center best player: 2004.

References

1972 births
Footballers from Voronezh
Living people
Soviet footballers
Russian footballers
Association football midfielders
Association football defenders
FC Fakel Voronezh players
Russian Premier League players
PFC CSKA Moscow players
FC Spartak Moscow players
FC Salyut Belgorod players
Russian football managers
FC Fakel Voronezh managers